Rendezvous (stylized as Rendezvous: The Playlist) is a playlist by Nigerian rapper M.I Abaga. It was released by Chocolate City on February 9, 2018. The playlist features guest appearances from Cassper Nyovest, AKA, Wande Coal, Falz, Yung L, Dice Ailes, Ckay, Nonso Amadi, Santi, Odunsi the Engine, Chillz, Tomi Thomas, Joules Da Kid, Ajebutter22, Terry Apala, Strafitti, Trigga Madtonic, Blaqbonez and UA.x. It also features skits from a number of radio personalities, including Vic-O, Charles Okocha, Douglas Jekan, Kemi Smallz and Do2tun. Rendezvous was supported by the singles "Your Father" and "Lekki".

Background
Rendezvous was recorded after Yung Denzel and contains leftover tracks that did not make the latter project. M.I released the playlist after announcing the release date for Yung Denzel. Inspired by Drake's More Life project, its release marked the first of its kind in the Nigerian music industry. Rendezvous was recorded in a haphazard nature. Wande Coal recorded the chorus for "Kososhi" in 2013. M.I began working with Odunsi the Engine and GMK after meeting them in February 2017. In an interview on the Loose Talk podcast, M.I said he scrapped some of the tracks on the playlist after being told by Odunsi the Engine to do so. He also said he had to switch up from doing 4-bar loops to 3-bar loops. Primarily a hip hop playlist, Rendezvous combines elements of trap music with groovy R&B and lyrically-driven reggaeton. Rendezvous is not M.I's most personal project, but is considered less playful than his third studio album The Chairman (2014).

Composition
On the playlist's opener "Sunset", M.I throws a subliminal diss at N6, a rapper and OAP. In the energetic track "Soup", he and Cassper Nyovest recount their victories against hatred and negativity.  The soothing melodic track "Playlist" is a seductive ode to M.I's love interest. M.I made braggadocios assertions on a number of tracks, including "Kososhi", "One Code" and "Your Father". "One Way" features a comical skit by comedian Charles Okpocha, who lectured listeners about the monetary differences between "the small boys and the big boys". The Ghost-assisted track "Popping" is a reincarnation of "Safe", a song from M.I's debut studio album Talk About It (2008). The reggae-infused track "The Crew" has been described as "groovy". The electropop track "One Time" features vocals by Moelogo. The Dice Ailes-assisted trap song "Your Father" has been described as a "juvenile, belligerent energy that fits its guest more than Mr. Abaga".

Singles and other releases
The Dice Ailes-assisted track "Your Father" was released on December 1, 2017, as the playlist's lead single. The accompanying music video for "Your Father" was directed by The Myth. In a review for Konbini Channels, Daniel Orubo said the "Humble"-inspired video is "nowhere near as cohesive or satisfying". The playlist's second single "Lekki" was released on October 2, 2018. The song's music video highlights the nightlife scene in Lagos and features cameo appearances from Nedu, Blaqbonez and Zoro.

On August 2, 2019, M.I released the music video for "Playlist". It was directed by Seyi Akinlade and features retro themes, particularly a 70s-inspired look blended into a modern context. The Nonso Amadi-assisted track is a fusion of jazz and hip-hop.

Critical reception

Rendezvous received generally positive reviews from music critics. Twitter reactions to the playlist were positive. Victor Okpala of Nigerian Entertainment Today described the playlist as a "decent crossroad of musical diversity" and said it "reflects a laudable degree of evolution and flexibility that not so many rappers can boast of". A writer for Pulse Nigeria characterized it as "an extension of his relevance to an age and class of younger musicians and their fans", and opined that all of the acts featured on it won from a musical standpoint.

Jim Donnett gave the playlist 3.5 stars out of 5 in a review for TooXclusive. Donnett stated: "Longtime M.I fans who fell in love with his reflective lyricism on Illegal Music 2 for instance, and his ironically tall posture on MI 2: The Movie, would love this playlist less than his potentially new set of listeners who I expect to appreciate his syncing with their favourite alternative artistes". A writer for BellaNaija, who goes by the moniker Black Boy, said Rendezvous is being celebrated because of the "transient satisfaction it offers, even though its long-term impact remains uncertain". Black Boy also said it "isn't his best project but it has enough quality to rank high on the Nigerian Hip Hop chart of today". Dennis Peter, writing for Filter Free Nigeria, said the playlist is "a better repeat of the same communal tactic integral to The Chairman, with each artist and producer playing to their strengths, while still in service to a project that is Mr. Abaga's most diverse and most sophisticated fabric yet".

Track listing 

Notes
  signifies a co-producer
  signifies an additional producer

Personnel
Credits were adapted from the album's back cover.

M.I Abaga – primary artist, production 
Cassper Nyovest – featured artist
Tomi Thomas – featured artist
Santi – featured artist
Joules Da Kid – featured artist
Wande Coal – featured artist
Dice Ailes – featured artist
Moelogo – featured artist
AKA – featured artist
Ghost – featured artist
Terry Apala – featured artist
Falz – featured artist
Ajebutter22 – featured artist
Straffitti – featured artist
Blaqbonez – featured artist
Yung L – featured artist
Ua.X – featured artist
Trigga Madtonic – featured artist
Chillz – featured artist, production 
Nonso Amadi – featured artist, production 
Odunsi the Engine – featured artist, production 
Ckay – featured artist, production 
Chopstix – production 
Higo – production 
TMXO – production 
HVRRY – production 
G Plus – production , mixing and mastering 
GMK – mixing and mastering 
Dapo Oyewusi – mixing and mastering

Release history

References 

M.I albums
2018 albums
Chocolate City (music label) albums
Albums produced by Chopstix